Coal River may refer to:

Rivers
Coal River (Canada), in Yukon and British Columbia
Coal River (Fiordland), in New Zealand
Coal River (Canterbury), in New Zealand
Coal River (West Virginia), in the United States
Coal River (Tasmania), in Australia

Other
Coal River (book), a 2008 nonfiction book about mountaintop removal mining in the United States
Coal River was the early name for the Australian settlement which became Newcastle, New South Wales